Aaron Virl Osmond (born October 31, 1969) is a former Republican member of the Utah Senate, representing the 10th district. He resigned from office December 5, 2015.

Early life, education, and career
Aaron Osmond was born and raised in Provo, Utah; he is the son of George Virl Osmond Jr., the oldest member of the Osmond Brothers, whose participation in the family's musical business was limited due to hearing impairment. Aaron served a two-year mission for the Church of Jesus Christ of Latter-day Saints (LDS Church) in Rome, Italy. He received a B.S. in business management from the University of Phoenix.

While taking his degree, he also worked for WordPerfect and Novell for twelve years. In 2003 he joined Microsoft, where he managed a $200 million educational product line. In 2007, he started investing in real estate. During that time he served as the CEO of Real Estate Investor Education, LLC for 3 years. In April 2012, he assumed responsibility as VP of North America for Certiport, an IT Education Testing Company. Since 2014, he has been vice president of global sales, initially remaining with Certiport, before shifting in 2018 to work directly for its parent company, Pearson Clinical Assessments.

Osmond volunteers as vice chair on the board of trustees for the Utah System of Technology Colleges. He also sits as a board member on the Employability to Careers Program Board and on the Sacred Innocence Foundation.

Aaron and his wife Nancy are the parents of 5 children. Nancy is a Pediatric Registered Nurse by profession. Their family has lived in South Jordan since 2006.

Political career 
In 2011, Osmond was elected as state senator for Utah's 10th district, formerly represented by Chris Buttars. In 2013, he attracted national attention when he called for an end to compulsory education. Senator Osmond has been affiliated with South Jordan Chamber of Commerce as the Vice Chair and the Provo City Planning Commission/Board of Adjustments. In 2014, Osmond served on the Higher Education Appropriations Subcommittee, Public Education Appropriations Subcommittee, the Chair of the Senate Economic Development and Workforce Services Committee, and the Senate Education Committee. In 2015, Osmond stepped down from the Senate after considering the top post at the Utah College of Applied Technology.

Pivotal Bills/ In the News

2012

SB64 – Public Education Employment Reform 
Senator Osmond wasted no time trying to make an impact on longstanding state laws. One notable bill from his freshman year as a senator was SB64, which targeted public education employment. The bill was introduced February 8, 2012, and the very next day, Osmond posted an introduction to the bill online, which stated some of the goals he was trying to achieve with the legislation.

The initial reaction to the bill was mixed, with particularly strong opponents among those in the field of public education. Osmond knew some changes needed to take place, so he did not want to back down, but he also wanted to ensure the changes he made would be informed and reflective of the problems actually facing the state. To achieve this goal, he put the bill on hold, brought a number of interested parties to the table, and took into account a number of varying views. Additional changes were made to the bill to the point that it received overwhelming support from both houses (it passed the House 73-1 and the Senate 26-2) and additional endorsements by parents, teachers, and other interested parties. The Utah Education Association (UEA) even published a piece discussing the good done by the bill. The UEA is careful to note the work Osmond put in to ensure he heard and applied input from voices on all sides of the issue.

The UEA article points out a number of changes Osmond made after soliciting his feedback. Where the initial bill made all educators at-will employees and based salary on performance evaluations, the final legislation removed both of these changes. Some voices in the Senate wanted these stronger provisions reinstated, but Osmond decided it was better to take small steps on these issues and involve educators, rather than making sweeping changes without their input.

The bill itself adjusts provisions regarding the status and termination of school district employees and educator evaluations. It directs the state board of education to make rules requiring annual performance evaluations for school district employees (with a few exceptions). The data on those educator ratings are to be publicly reported, and procedures are set forth for non-renewal or termination of a career employee’s contract based on unsatisfactory performance. Finally, the salaries of certain administrative positions are made contingent upon these evaluations.

This bill was not only an early satisfaction in Osmond’s legislative career, but it also gave him experience dealing with difficult topics, enforced the value of soliciting multiple perspectives, and enlarged his perspective on issues of public education. Many of the skills Osmond used throughout his time with the senate came from things he learned with this bill. After gleaning insight from interested parties, he wrote a piece called “Lessons Learned and Next Steps” in which he discusses what he discovered in the course of working with so many active citizens of the state.

2013

SB131 – Assault Amendments 
In his sophomore year, Osmond carried a heavier legislative load. Notable in the 2013 general session was a bill he ran that amended the state definition of assault, providing additional offenses (second and third degree assault charges) for assaulting a peace officer or military service member in uniform.

An End to Compulsory Education? 
In 2013, Osmond attracted national attention when he wrote a senate blog suggesting an end to compulsory education. He argued that requiring education had unintended negative consequences in that it allowed parents to disengage from their children’s education in ways that were detrimental."Some parents completely disengage themselves from their obligation to oversee and ensure the successful education of their children. Some parents act as if the responsibility to educate, and even care for their child, is primarily the responsibility of the public school system. As a result, our teachers and schools have been forced to become surrogate parents, expected to do everything from behavioral counseling, to providing adequate nutrition, to teaching sex education, as well as ensuring full college and career readiness. Unfortunately, in this system, teachers rarely receive meaningful support or engagement from parents and occasionally face retaliation when they attempt to hold a child accountable for bad behavior or poor academic performance."While the call for ending compulsory education is what attracted the most attention, Osmond goes on to suggest other amendments to our school systems in line with his basic beliefs that parents should be more involved. Among these other changes, Osmond suggested increased and adequate state funding for schools, shifting more responsibility for education to local school boards, encouraging more people to attend and participate in school board meetings, and eliminating the statewide requirement of 990 educational hours each year (he suggested the decision of how many hours should rest with local school districts). (Huffpost Article).

Osmond’s ideas received widespread criticism from some, while others suggested his radical changes did not go far enough. In future years, the core of these initial sentiments went on to shape much of Osmond’s legislative career. He never pressed the issue of compulsory education after that point, but championed legislation to place more educational responsibility on parents.

2014

SB39 – Home School Amendments 
Osmond’s SB39 in 2014 provided greater freedom for homeschool students and their parents to pursue education with more freedom than had been previously allowed by the state. The bill modified procedures for getting a student excused from public school and eliminated mandatory instructional requirements for homeschool students. This allowed the homeschool students to focus on their education rather than meeting a mandated number of hours or topics as decided by the state. Many homeschool parents saw this as a victory that allowed them the freedom to emphasize and pace their children’s education in a way best suited for them. (KSL Homeschool Relief). Osmond clarified that he believed parents should be primarily responsible for their children’s education, with the state serving in a secondary position. The bill sparked some concern that some homeschool parents would use this freedom as an excuse to not educate their children, or to do so inadequately. The bill addressed some of these concerns by requiring homeschool students to still qualify for college entrance exams or workforce readiness metrics. Additionally, if a homeschool student returns to public school, SB39 included assessment procedures to ensure proper academic placement of that student.

SB122 – Parental Rights in Public Education 
The sentiments Osmond began with SB39 and his homeschool amendments continued with SB122, which reformed parent rights in their children’s education. He felt strongly that parents should hold the primary responsibility to educate their children, and schools and the state held a second responsibility with an obligation to support parents. To support this, he created what he called the “parental bill of rights.” Of note, this bill gave parents the freedom to retain a student on a grade level (for academic, social, emotional, or other reasons), select or change a teacher, visit and observe school freely, excuse their student without a doctor’s note, and determine placement in specialized or advanced courses.

A Stand Against Child Abuse – The HB286 Debate 
While not a bill that Osmond was deeply involved with, HB286 was a turning point for him in both his legislative career and in his personal life. The legislation originated in the house and made its way to the senate with a number of important provisions to protect children against sexual abuse. One of these provisions allowed school districts and charter schools to provide instruction on recognizing and preventing abuse. The bill, as drafted, required such schools to send notification to parents of the instruction and include instructional materials to review.  When the bill was on the senate floor, an amendment was proposed that would intensify these requirements and prohibit schools from providing such instruction unless parental consent had been obtained.

Osmond was very vocal in his defense of the original bill. He reiterated his firm belief in parental rights for education, but clarified that those rights were recognized in the bill as written. Parents would receive notification and have the opportunity to review the instructional materials. Requiring parental consent, he said, would allow too many children to slip through the cracks, leaving them vulnerable because their families missed the opportunity to give consent for these trainings. Osmond even went so far as to reveal—for the first time in his life—that he had been a victim of child abuse, and that, though he came from a strong family, the proposed amendment would require a consent that his parents may not have even seen a request for, much less given.

Osmond’s powerful stand for the bill against child abuse received a great deal of attention from the community, and he was recognized for his stance by the Prevent Child Abuse Utah association (PCAU) when they made him the recipient of the Anne Freimuth Child Advocate of the Year Award. A video was compiled, which included a recording of Osmond’s powerful defense of children and a speech given by his brother Joseph at the PCAU event where Osmond was honored.

2015

SB97 – Property Tax Equalization 
For the 2015 session, Senator Osmond took on one of the most difficult issues of his time in the senate: education funding. Much of Utah’s education funding comes from property taxes, but the state’s property tax rate had not been adjusted since 1996, almost two decades before. Estimates indicated that inflation alone meant $90 million in losses due to this lack of change. At the same time, many school districts were not providing funding for their own students, and more than half were well below the state’s average per-pupil funding rate.

In an attempt to generate better funding for students, Osmond hoped to capture some of that revenue lost to inflation. He didn't go so far as to recapture all of it, but by capturing a portion ($75 million), he was able to bring all school districts up to at least that average per-pupil rate.

The bill Osmond proposed distributed the revenue generated by this property tax increase into existing funds (the Minimum Basic Growth Account, the Voted Levy Guarantee, the Capital Outlay Foundation Program, and the Capital Outlay Enrollment Growth Program). Districts that were most in need of funding received more of the revenue, while wealthy districts received less, thus equalizing to some degree the amount of per-pupil spending across the state. Early in the 2015 session, Osmond published a video explaining his hopes for the bill.

SB97 met with mixed responses. Some were very supportive of the increased and equalized school funding. Others were critical of the tax increase, especially since some districts in the state (Park City, for example) likely would not see much of the increased funding from the tax they paid. In the end, public polling showed support for the bill, but the margin was not large. Some members of Osmond’s own political party were ardently against this bill, which made democratic support essential to its passage. Osmond worked hard persuading members on both side of the aisle and managed to pass the bill 20-9 in the Senate and 43-31 in the house, with members from both parties working together to ensure its passage.

SB167 – Juvenile Offender Amendments 
Also in 2015, Osmond ran a bill to alter the treatment of juvenile offenders in the criminal justice system. Among the amendments made, SB167 required new guidelines for housing convicted minors, required that the court ensure any waiver of counsel was knowing and intentional, and created a presumption that minors should not be shackled when appearing in court. Osmond felt very strongly that shackling all juvenile defendants was unnecessary and embarrassing, and ensured that such treatment would no longer be the norm.

2012 Legislation

2013 Legislation

2014 Legislation

2015 Legislation

References

1969 births
Living people
Politicians from Provo, Utah
Republican Party Utah state senators
University of Phoenix alumni